VA-15 has the following meanings:
Attack Squadron 15 (U.S. Navy)

Virginia State Route 15 (disambiguation)